Salten-Schlern is a district in South Tyrol, Italy. It comprises the lower part of the valley of the Eisack River, from Waidbruck to Bolzano. It is named after the Salten plateau and the mountain Schlern. The seat of the district is in Bolzano, itself not part of the district.

Overview
According to the 2001 census, 77.15% of the population of the district speak German, 18.82% Ladin and 4.03% Italian as mother language.

The following municipalities are part of the Salten-Schlern district:
Deutschnofen
Jenesien
Karneid
Kastelruth
Mölten
Ritten
Santa Cristina Gherdëina
Sarntal
Sëlva
Tiers
Urtijëi
Völs am Schlern
Welschnofen

The capital, Bolzano, is administratively separated from the district.

References

External links

Salten-Schlern District 

Districts of South Tyrol